Iolaus aequatorialis is a butterfly in the family Lycaenidae. It is found in Zambia, north-western Tanzania, Uganda, the Democratic Republic of the Congo (Sankuru) and Gabon.

The larvae feed on Phragmanthera usuiensis and Phragmanthera polycrypta subglabriflora.

References

Butterflies described in 1958
Iolaus (butterfly)